The 2010 Ladies Tour of Qatar was the second edition of the Ladies Tour of Qatar cycling stage race. It was rated by the UCI as category 2.1, and was held between 3 and 5 February 2010, in Qatar.

Final classifications

General classification

Points classification

Youth classification

References

External links

2010 in women's road cycling
2010 in Qatari sport
2010
February 2010 sports events in Asia